Klingende Blume is an outdoor sculpture by Achim Kühn, installed at Treptower Park in Berlin, Germany.

References

Buildings and structures in Treptow-Köpenick
Outdoor sculptures in Berlin